Crocus niveus  is a species of Crocus from  Greece.

References

External links
 
 

niveus